Transcription is a scientific journal published by Taylor & Francis focusing on the subject of the transcription of DNA. Its stated aim is to publish "high-quality articles that provide novel insights, provocative questions, and new hypotheses into the expanding field of gene transcription".

External links

References

Molecular and cellular biology journals
Taylor & Francis academic journals
5 times per year journals